Nathalie Boutefeu (born 1968) is a French actress, film director and screenwriter. She has appeared in 40 films since 1990. She starred in the film The Butterfly's Dream, which was screened in the Un Certain Regard section at the 1994 Cannes Film Festival.

Selected filmography
 The Butterfly's Dream (1994)
 Irma Vep (1996)
 Port Djema (1997)
 Sachs' Disease (1999)
 Pau and His Brother (2001)
 Savage Souls (2001)
 A+ Pollux (2002)
 His Brother (2003)
 Kings and Queen (2004)
 A Secret (2007)
 Loving Without Reason (2012)
 Candice Renoir (2015)
 A Couple (2022)

References

External links

1968 births
Living people
French film actresses
French film directors
Actors from Dijon
French women screenwriters
French screenwriters
20th-century French actresses
21st-century French actresses
French women film directors